Tabor Hall is a multi-purpose sports venue in Maribor, Slovenia. 

Completed in 1984, it has a capacity for 3,261 spectators. The complex consists of two halls; the main hall for basketball, volleyball, handball and mass events, and the smaller hall, which is mostly used for table tennis and bowling, and also has a fitness centre.

References

Sports venues completed in 1984
Sport in Maribor
Indoor arenas in Slovenia
Handball venues in Slovenia
Volleyball venues in Slovenia 
1984 establishments in Slovenia
20th-century architecture in Slovenia